St. Paul's Lutheran Church is a decorated Gothic Revival-style Lutheran church in northwest Washington, D.C. Currently located off of Connecticut Avenue NW, between Ellicott and Everett Streets, it was originally founded in 1843 as the first English-speaking Lutheran church in the District. St. Paul's is affiliated with the Evangelical Lutheran Church in America.

History

The land for St. Paul's original church building on the southwest corner of 11th and H Streets NW was donated by John Peter Van Ness. Van Ness and former President John Quincy Adams were present at the laying of the cornerstone in 1844, and President James K. Polk and Secretary of State James Buchanan were present for the church's dedication in 1848.

In 1926, the Evangelical Lutheran Church of the Epiphany, 16th and U Streets NW, merged with St. Paul's. Agreeing to keep the St. Paul's name and charter, they planned to erect a new church building on a plot owned by Epiphany at 4900 Connecticut Avenue NW. It was completed in 1958.

The Peter Muhlenberg Memorial, situated in front of the church, was built using private funds on land St. Paul's donated to the federal government.

See also
Evangelical Lutheran Church in America

References

External links

Metropolitan Washington, D.C. Synod Official Site

Churches completed in 1848
Churches completed in 1958
Lutheran churches in Washington, D.C.
19th-century Lutheran churches in the United States
Lutheranism in Washington, D.C.
Gothic Revival church buildings in Washington, D.C.